Gail Maurice is a Canadian actress, writer, and producer. She is most noted for her performances as the title character in the film Johnny Greyeyes, Dorothy Pine in the television series Cardinal, and Georgina in the television series Trickster.

Career 
Maurice is the head of Assini Productions, a film studio whose films have included Smudge (2006), Kihtwam misawac na-wapamitin (2011), Assini (2015) and Rosie (2018).

She was a co-writer and star of Joshua Demers's 2020 film Québexit. At the 2020 Whistler Film Festival, Maurice, Demers and Xavier Yuvens won the Borsos Competition award for Best Screenplay in a Canadian Film.

At the 9th Canadian Screen Awards in 2021, she received a nomination for Best Supporting Actress in a Drama Program or Series for her performance in Trickster. At the 10th Canadian Screen Awards in 2022, she was nominated for Best Supporting Actress in a Film, for the film Night Raiders.

Rosie, Maurice's debut feature film as a director and an expansion of her 2018 short film of the same name, premiered in the Discovery program at the 2022 Toronto International Film Festival.

Personal life
Maurice is in a relationship with Mélanie Bray, one of the stars of Rosie.

Filmography

Film

Television

References

External links

20th-century Canadian actresses
21st-century Canadian actresses
21st-century Canadian screenwriters
Canadian film actresses
Canadian television actresses
Canadian Métis people
Actresses from Saskatchewan
Film directors from Saskatchewan
Writers from Saskatchewan
Canadian documentary film directors
Canadian women film directors
Canadian women film producers
Canadian women screenwriters
First Nations actresses
First Nations filmmakers
Living people
Year of birth missing (living people)
First Nations screenwriters
Canadian LGBT actors
LGBT film directors
Canadian women documentary filmmakers
LGBT First Nations people
Canadian LGBT screenwriters
21st-century Canadian LGBT people
20th-century Canadian LGBT people